Morgantown is a city in and the county seat of Monongalia County, West Virginia, United States, situated along the Monongahela River. The largest city in North-Central West Virginia, Morgantown is best known as the home of West Virginia University. The population was 30,347 at the 2020 census. The city serves as the anchor of the Morgantown metropolitan area, which had a population of 138,176 in 2020.

History

Morgantown's history is closely tied to the Anglo-French struggle for this territory. Until the Treaty of Paris in 1763, what is now known as Morgantown was greatly contested by white settlers and Native Americans, and by British and French soldiers. The treaty decided the issue in favor of the British, but Indian fighting continued almost to the beginning of the American Revolutionary War in 1775.

Zackquill Morgan and David Morgan, sons of Morgan Morgan, entered the area of Virginia that would become Morgantown around 1767, although others, such as Thomas Decker, were recorded as attempting to settle in the area a decade earlier. Zackquill and David lived here for a few years and eventually built Fort Morgan in present-day Downtown Morgantown in 1772. Several forts were built in the area during this time: Fort Pierpont near the Cheat River, in 1769; Fort Coburn, near Dorsey's Knob, in 1770. Fort Morgan, at the present site of Morgantown, in 1772; Fort Dinwiddie, north several miles at Stewartstown, in 1772; Fort Martin, several miles north on the Monongahela River, in 1773; Fort Burris in the present-day Suncrest area of Morgantown, in 1774; and Fort Kern in the present-day Greenmont area of Morgantown, in 1774, in addition to other, smaller forts.

Zackquill Morgan settled the area about 1772 by establishing a homestead near present-day Fayette Street and University Avenue. Morgan fought in both the French and Indian War and the American Revolutionary War, rising to the rank of colonel. By 1783, following his wartime duties, Colonel Morgan commissioned Major William Haymond to survey his land and divide it into streets and lots. On February 3, 1838, the Virginia General Assembly enacted a municipal charter incorporating the city, now with a population of about 700, as Morgantown, Virginia. The town became part of the newly created state of West Virginia on June 20, 1863, through the Reorganized Government of Virginia.

Notable early structures still standing in Morgantown, include the Old Stone House, built in 1795 by Jacob Nuce on Long Alley (the modern-day Chestnut Street) and the John Rogers family home on Foundry Street, built in 1840 and occupied as of 2011 by the Dering Funeral Home.

During the 1970s, the U.S. Department of Transportation built an experimental driverless personal rapid transit system in the city, citing the area's variable seasonal climate and geographic elevations as factors in testing the technology's viability. The Morgantown Personal Rapid Transit (PRT) has been in use since 1975. University students use the system for free travel between the campuses.

Geography

Morgantown is just south of the Mason–Dixon line.

Terrain
Morgantown lies in the Appalachian Region. The area surrounding Morgantown is mountainous.

Climate
Morgantown lies in the transition between a humid subtropical (Köppen Cfa) and humid continental climate (Köppen Dfa), with four distinct seasons. Precipitation is generous, with winter being the driest period and May through July the wettest.

Neighborhoods

Morgantown is made up of several neighborhoods, some of which had been independent towns that were annexed by the city as it continued to grow. Neighborhoods include First Ward, Woodburn, South Park, Jerome Park, South Hills, Second Ward, Greenmont, Suncrest, Evansdale, Wiles Hill, Sunnyside, Sabraton, the Mileground, and North Hills. While some of these, such as the Mileground, Easton, and Sabraton, are in part or entirely outside the city limits, they are still considered part of Morgantown. The City of Morgantown contained an estimated 31,073 residents in 2014. Morgantown MSA enrolls over 30,000  full-time students at West Virginia University.

Suncrest

Fort Burris was erected in 1774 in what became the Suncrest area of Morgantown. The fort was a settler's blockhouse in what is, as of 2019, the Summers Masonic Lodge at the intersection of Burroughs and Windsor streets.

Drummond's Chapel was named after a minister who then moved to Missouri. The Evans Farm was on land near Riverview Drive and 8th Street and was named for Colonel John Evans, who fought in the American Revolution with Morgantown founder Zack Morgan. The Krepps farmhouse was on land where the West Virginia University Creative Arts Center, Engineering and Agricultural buildings would later be built. Dilley Farm was on the other side of 8th street. The Van Voorhis Farm was large. Down Collins Ferry Road was the Anderson Farm. The Jacobs Farm was below Elmhurst and Mulberry.

Trolley cars determined how far people lived outside of the city, and did not reach to what is now Suncrest. By 1920, however, cars were becoming common.

In 1923, the Monongahela Development Company bought land from Krepps and most others else in the area. Suncrest Park bought Sears Roebuck house plans and divided Suncrest into three areas: Fairfield Street, Suncrest Park and Suncrest. In 1928, the Suncrest Home Association developers gave  for what became Krepps Park. A civic group built facilities and the park was given to Morgantown, which made some improvements.

By 1937, Suncrest needed a town government to pave streets and provide water and sewer. Dr. Julian Leach, a WVU plant pathologist, was elected mayor; Bill Hart was a later mayor. Suncrest finally became part of Morgantown. In 1940 the Dupont industrial park around the Kenmore Street area built 100 homes with six different floor plans. From 1947 to 1950, Gunnison homes were built in the Mulberry and Lake Street areas. The development of the DuPont Ordnance Works during World War II in Westover resulted in a large number of prefabricated homes being constructed in Suncrest. Old Suncrest and Suncrest Addition were among the names given to subsections of this growing community. Some street names reflected the community's participation in service organizations, such as Civitan, Kiwanis, Lions and Rotary. Before Suncrest became part of Morgantown in 1949, it was first incorporated in 1937 as the town of Suncrest; the name came from a developer who looked out one morning and saw the sun crest over a hill.

The area from University Avenue to the university's medical school once held a racetrack. When there was talk of building a medical school in West Virginia, Charleston and Huntington vied for it, but Morgantown offered to give  and provide a county hospital. A cemetery with 200 graves near what is now Ruby Memorial Hospital had to be moved to the West Run area. Around 1928, there was an airport near where the West Virginia University Coliseum was later built.

Sunnyside
Sunnyside, just north of downtown Morgantown, is an older neighborhood adjacent to West Virginia University's downtown campus. The neighborhood is bounded by University Avenue to the east and Campus Drive to the south. Close to the downtown campus of West Virginia University and for decades known as a neighborhood of student housing, is also the scene of many off-campus parties and post-game celebrations including, until 1995, the unsanctioned annual back-to-school block party that would annually draw upward of 10,000 revelers to celebrate the start of fall classes. The university and city put an end to the tradition that year after two students, Monica Potter of Pittsburgh, Pennsylvania, and Jason Callahan of Pennsauken, New Jersey, were shot in the leg the previous year.

The City of Morgantown and West Virginia University jointly established the Sunnyside Up Project: Campus Neighborhoods Revitalization Corporation, dedicated to the redevelopment of this area. The first step was to create a comprehensive revitalization plan, which was published in fall 2004.

The university's Summit Hall Dormitory and the Honors Hall Dormitory are in the southern part of the neighborhood.

First Ward
First Ward is south of High Street in Morgantown. First Ward Elementary School was formerly located there; however, it was demolished and the playground area converted to Jack Roberts Park, one of two parks in the area along with White Park. Both include recreational facilities. The city's reservoir is in this neighborhood and sports several biking and hiking trails on almost all sides. White Park is the location of the Morgantown Municipal Ice Arena and also features athletic fields and wooded hiking trails. The Mountaineer Mall, Morgantown's first mall, is here, as are South Middle School and the Monongalia County Technical Education Center. The Wharf District is along the west side of First Ward, on the banks of the Monongahela River.

South Park
South Park is across Deckers Creek from downtown Morgantown. Originally farmland, it was one of the first suburbs of Morgantown. In the early 20th century, South Park experienced a housing boom, with wealthy and influential citizens settling there. The neighborhood is home to Morgantown High School, built in 1924 and later expanded. The neighborhood is designated a historic district by the National Register of Historic Places.

Woodburn

Woodburn used to be farmland on the hills to the east of downtown Morgantown. It encompasses the area enclosed by Richwood Avenue in the south and Willey Street in the north. Monongalia Avenue serves as the western boundary and the eastern boundary begins in the south at the intersection of Richwood Avenue and Darst Street, and continues north until Darst intersects with Willey Street at the beginning of the Mileground. 

While it used to be home to small hillside farmsteads, Woodburn grew into a typical city neighborhood in the late 19th century. Many of the street names, such as Louise Avenue, James Street, and Ridgeway Avenue, are named for early farm families, and many of the original farmhouses remained standing in the first decade of the 21st century. The area saw a rapid growth in population at the beginning of the 20th century as home to tinsmiths from Wales who came to work in the tinplate mill that later became the Sterling Faucet Company plant in Sabraton. A trolley line ran the length of Richwood Avenue and originally connected downtown with Sabraton. The Welsh community was active in the Methodist Church at the intersection of High Street and Willey Street, and held picnics in Whitemoore Park, the main green space in Woodburn.  Many of these immigrants retained the Welsh language, and as late as the 1930s it was common to hear Welsh spoken on the streets of Woodburn and the community was known for carrying on a traditional eisteddfod every year. Woodburn Elementary School was the neighborhood school built in 1910.

Following World War II, many new families came to Woodburn, attracted by the parkland, close proximity to downtown, community atmosphere, and nearby school. In 1950, Tom and Anna Torch opened the Richwood Avenue Confectionery, a corner store and lunch counter that served beer in large Weiss goblets from the Morgantown Glassworks. When they sold the operation in 1963 to Mario and Rose Spina, the establishment was nicknamed "Marios Fishbowl" in honor of the goblets. 

A neighborhood newspaper was published here in the 1980s.

Jerome Park
Primarily residential Jerome Park is to the east of Woodburn. In 2012, the city bought two acres that include the old Jerome Park Elementary School playground, and made it a park called the Paul Preserve. The neighborhood also contains Whitemoore Park.

Sabraton
Located in the southeastern part of Morgantown, Sabraton is a former coal town and was previously known as Sturgiss City and Sabraton Station. The community was named after Sabra Vance Sturgiss, the wife of a local judge.

Part of Sabraton was home to a tin plate mill, which later become a manufacturing plant for Sterling Faucet. In its early days, Sabraton was connected to downtown Morgantown by a trolley line that ran the length of Richwood Avenue. Its amenities include Marilla Park.

Demographics

Following the 2010 census, Monongalia County and neighboring Preston County were acknowledged as a metropolitan statistical area (MSA) by the United States government. Estimates from 2010 put the Metropolitan Statistical Area population at 129,709; as of July 2013, the estimate was 136,133. Of the 10 largest cities in West Virginia, only Morgantown and Martinsburg have shown positive population growth since the 2010 census, with Morgantown growing from 29,660 to a 2012 estimate of 31,000.

West Virginia University constitutes  of the city and vicinity, and with the fall 2012 enrollment added an additional population of 29,707 students.

According to the Bureau of Labor Statistics, Morgantown had some of the lowest unemployment rates in the United States as of early 2009.

2020 census 
As of the 2020 census, there were 30,347 people and 11,673 households residing in the city. There were 13,887 housing units in Morgantown. The racial makeup of the city was 83% White, 4.6% African American, 3.7% Asian, 0.2% Native American, 1.3% from other races, and 7.1% from two or more races. Hispanics or Latinos of any race were 4.1% of the population.

Of the 11,673 households,  28.3% were married couples living together,  34.6 % had a male householder with no spouse present,  28.3% had a female householder with no spouse present.The average household and family size was 2.71. The median age in the city was 24.4 years. Which is 43% less than the state average of 42.8.

2010 census
As of the census of 2010, there were 29,660 people, 11,701 households, and 3,827 families residing in the city. The racial makeup of the city was 89.7% White, 4.1% African American, 0.1% Native American, 3.4% Asian, 0.1% Pacific Islander, 0.6% from other races, and 2.0% from two or more races. Hispanic or Latino of any race were 2.6% of the population. 

There were 11,701 households, of which 12.0% had children under the age of 18 living with them, 23.1% were married couples living together, 6.5% had a female householder with no husband present, 3.1% had a male householder with no wife present, and 67.3% were non-families. 36.6% of all households were made up of individuals, and 7.1% had someone living alone who was 65 years of age or older. The average household size was 2.05 and the average family size was 2.71.

The median age in the city was 22.6 years. 8.2% of residents were under the age of 18; 52.1% were between the ages of 18 and 24; 18.4% were from 25 to 44; 13.1% were from 45 to 64; and 8.1% were 65 years of age or older. The gender makeup of the city was 53.5% male and 46.5% female.

2000 census
As of the census of 2000, there were 26,809 people, 10,782 households, and 4,183 families residing in the city. The population density was 2,736.0 people per square mile (1,056.2/km2). There were 11,721 housing units at an average density of 1,196.2 per square mile (461.8/km2). The racial makeup of the city was 89.48% White, 4.15% African American, 0.17% Native American, 4.15% Asian, 0.05% Pacific Islander, 0.51% from other races, and 1.48% from two or more races. Hispanic or Latino of any race were 1.54% of the population.

There were 10,782 households, out of which 15.0% had children under the age of 18 living with them, 29.1% were married couples living together, 7.0% had a female householder with no husband present, and 61.2% were non-families. 37.3% of all households were made up of individuals, and 9.5% had someone living alone who was 65 years of age or older. The average household size was 2.08 and the average family size was 2.76.

Morgantown's age distribution, which is heavily influenced by the presence of West Virginia University, is: 11.1% under the age of 18, 44.7% from 18 to 24, 20.4% from 25 to 44, 13.5% from 45 to 64, and 10.4% who were 65 years of age or older. The median age was 23 years. For every 100 females, there were 104.7 males. For every 100 females age 18 and over, there were 105.0 males.

The median income for a household in the city was $20,649, and the median income for a family was $44,622. Males had a median income of $33,268 versus $24,944 for females. The per capita income for the city was $14,459. About 15.0% of families and 38.4% of the population were below the poverty line, including 23.3% of those under age 18 and 8.3% of those age 65 or over.

Arts and culture

Points of interest
 Core Arboretum
 Dorsey Knob
 Hazel Ruby McQuain Riverfront Park
 The Metropolitan Theatre (former vaudeville house)
 Monongalia Arts Center (MAC)
 Monongalia County Courthouse
 Mountaineer Field
 WVU Coliseum
 Caperton and Deckers Creek Rail-Trails
 Personal Rapid Transit system (PRT)
 West Virginia University Art Museum
 Morgantown History Museum

Sports

Baseball
The West Virginia Black Bears are a collegiate summer baseball team based in Morgantown. The team is part of the MLB Draft League. Games are played at the Monongalia County Ballpark in nearby Granville.

Running
The inaugural Morgantown Marathon was held in September 2015. The  course winds through Morgantown's seven wards and is characterized by its elevation changes. Official times from the Morgantown Marathon can be used for Boston Marathon qualification. In addition to the full marathon race, the Morgantown Marathon also includes The Mountain Mama 8k and a half-marathon.

Education
The city is served by Monongalia County Schools. Public elementary schools in Morgantown and its surrounding area include Cheat Lake, North, Brookhaven, Ridgedale, Mountainview, Mylan Park, Skyview, Suncrest Elementary, and Eastwood. There are four middle schools: Mountaineer Middle, South, Westwood, and Suncrest Middle. The city's two high schools are University High School, the mascot of which is the Hawks, and Morgantown High School, whose mascot is the Mohigans. The latter's name is that of a non-existent Native American tribe whose name is a combination of the words Morgantown (MO) High (HIG) Annual (AN), which was the school's yearbook. The Native American mascot and logo were adopted because of the close relation to the name Mohican, a real Native American tribe.  Notable Morgantown High School alumni include screenwriter–film director Lawrence Kasdan (class of 1966), actor Don Knotts (class of 1942), college football coach Tommy Bowden (class of 1972), and TV college football analyst Terry Bowden (class of 1974).

As of April 2005, Monongalia County Schools employed 897 professional personnel and 490 service personnel, and carries an enrollment of 10,076 students, including 156 adult students at the Monongalia County Technical Education Center. Three of Monongalia County's 23 schools have earned Exemplary Achievement status, according to the West Virginia Office of Educational Performance Audits' (OEPA) report issued November 2004. In 2004, Suncrest Middle became a National Blue Ribbon School for the No Child Left Behind Act.

Other private schools include: Morgantown Christian Academy, Maranatha Christian Academy, Covenant Christian School, Trinity Christian School, St. Francis Elementary/Middle School, and the alternative, non-religious Morgantown Learning Academy.

Early schools
While informal schools existed from Morgantown's earliest days,  the town established a one-story, coeducational, Virginia common school in July 1803, that students attended on a tuition basis. On Nov. 29, 1814, the Virginia General Assembly incorporated Monongalia Academy, the county's first public school. Supported by obligatory surveyors' fees, the male-only institution was the equivalent of a modern-day high school. The Academy moved to a new two-story building in 1830, with principal Jonathan Haddock offering courses in geography, surveying, and navigation in addition to traditional subjects. Presbyterian minister Reverend James Robertson Moore was principal during the Academy's 1852–1864 heyday, when its enrollment included students from 14 states. In 1867, the Academy closed, and donated its land toward the establishment of West Virginia University.

The Virginia Assembly in March 1831 authorized the creation of the Morgantown Female Academy. Proceeds from the sale of the original Monongalia Academy building funded construction of a two-story school at Bumbo Lane (the modern-day Fayette Street) and Long Alley (the modern-day Chestnut Street). This school opened April 1, 1834. After the Assembly approved a charter change in 1838, the school became known as the Methodist Academy. This prompted local Presbyterians to create the Woodburn Female Seminary, for which the Monongalia Academy's Rev. Moore also served as principal. The seminary closed in 1866, and its assets, like those of the Monongalia Academy, were donated toward the future university.

Following the 1863 creation of West Virginia, the new state's first legislature created a public-school system. The act provided for the education of "free colored children", and was adapted three years later to mandate education for all African-American children. However, a two-tier system was created: White children attended a regular term (at the second former Monongalia Academy building, purchased in 1867 from West Virginia Agricultural College, the future West Virginia University), only a short term was provided for African-Americans, who met at St. Paul's African Methodist Episcopal Church, on Beechurst Avenue.  In the late 19th and early 20th century, rural educational reformer Alexander Wade lived in Morgantown and was involved in establishing a system of graded education for country schools that was later adopted across the rest of the United States.

Roman Catholic schools

A Roman Catholic elementary school, Saint Francis de Sales, began sometime prior to 1915 as a two-room school in a house on McLane Avenue in the Seneca neighborhood, and run by lay teacher Miss Sterbutsal, who became Sister M. Isabelle of the Sisters of St. Joseph. In October 1915, the pastorate of Father Peter Flynn arranged for Ursuline nuns from Louisville, Kentucky, and in 1918, under principal Sister M. Isadore, the school moved to a new building on Beechurst Avenue, adjacent to St. Theresa's Church. On June 9, 1990, the grade school moved into the former St. Francis Central High School building, and eventually into newly built facility at 41 Guthrie Lane. Its mascot is the Trojan.

St. Francis Central High School existed for several decades on Birch Street in the Evansdale neighborhood until that campus was taken over by the elementary school on June 9, 1990. The West Virginia University Foundation purchased its building and land in July 2003, formally selling it to WVU for $11 million in August 2004, with the university then announcing it intended to use the football and adjacent baseball fields as intramural recreation area.

West Virginia University

West Virginia University (WVU) is a public land-grant university, founded in 1867. With an operating budget of approximately $1.2 billion as of 2022, it also has $150 million annually in sponsored contracts and research grants conducted by faculty members.

Fall 2021 enrollment was 28,267, with students from all 55 West Virginia counties, 49 states plus the District of Columbia, and 112 countries. Some basic 2021 figures regarding the student body are:
 46% residents, 54% nonresidents
 21,086 undergraduates
 5,753 graduate and professional students
 53% female, 47% male
 18% minorities

The 2022–2023 curriculum is supported by 13 colleges and schools offering 350 bachelor's, master's, doctoral, and professional degree programs in the arts and sciences; business and economics; creative arts; engineering and mineral resources; human resources and education; journalism; law; agriculture, forestry, and consumer sciences; dentistry; medicine; nursing; pharmacy; physical education; plus programs at Potomac State College and WVU Tech.

Media

Print
Morgantown has two newspapers. The Dominion Post is a privately owned newspaper which is published daily. The university-owned and student-run college newspaper, The Daily Athenaeum, is published on weekdays while classes are in session, and is provided free of charge on campus and to many businesses around Morgantown.

There are also other local quasi-newspapers such as the Post Extra and the Morgantown Times, which typically feature a few local news stories and an abundance of advertisements. Both are free of charge and mass-mailed throughout the Morgantown area.

Television
Morgantown is part of the Pittsburgh television market, though stations in the Clarksburg/Weston market claim Morgantown as part of their primary coverage area.

Radio

Infrastructure

Transportation

Airports
Morgantown Municipal Airport is one of West Virginia's few commercial airports.

Rail

The only active rail line near Morgantown is owned by Norfolk Southern with CSX trackage rights and serves a mine northwest of Rivesville, West Virginia. Coal is the major commodity, with a train serving local chemical industries such as Tanner and Addivant (formerly Chemtura) that require tank cars. These are trucked in and then loaded onto high side gondolas or bulkhead flat cars. Conrail was split by Norfolk Southern and CSX in 1999. CSX pays for half of the cost of maintenance for the line. CSX uses it mostly to bring trains from Grafton to load at Consol's Bailey Mine and for direct access to Pittsburgh, Pennsylvania.

River
Morgantown relies heavily on the Monongahela River for shipping coal and other products. The river is fully navigable from its mouth at the Ohio River in Pittsburgh, past Morgantown upstream to Fairmont. Morgantown Lock and Dam, in the southern part of the city, helps provide a continuous pool heading upstream towards the Hildebrand Lock and Dam. Point Marion Lock and Dam, the next downstream dam, is responsible for most of the river's pool in Morgantown.

Major roadways
  Interstate 79
  Interstate 68
  U.S. Highway 19
  U.S. Highway 119
  West Virginia Route 7
  West Virginia Route 705

Transit

Most of Morgantown is accessible by Mountain Line Transit Authority bus system. Most service operates Monday-Saturday from 7 a.m. to 6 p.m. with a very limited service operating on Sunday during the WVU school year. Mountain Line's Grey Line bus operates every day of the year between Clarksburg, West Virginia and Pittsburgh International Airport. Morgantown also has the Morgantown Personal Rapid Transit (PRT) system. The system has five stations (Walnut, Beechurst, Engineering, Towers, and Medical) covering .

Utilities
Electric service is provided by Mon Power, natural gas services by Dominion Resources, and water and sewage by the Morgantown Utility Board.

Cable television and cable Internet are provided by Comcast Communications. Landline telephone and DSL services are offered by Frontier Communications, with West Side Telecommunications telephone and DSL service available in some areas.

Trash pickup in the Morgantown area is provided by Republic Services. The City of Morgantown has adopted a weekly recycling program, as part of the Clean Community Concept, an initiative by the city government.

Notable people

 Earl E. Anderson, Ret. General, youngest active-duty Marine to become General
 John O. Bennett, New Jersey state senator
 Thomas Bennett, U.S. Army medic and conscientious objector, awarded Medal of Honor
 Jeff Bowden, Terry Bowden, Tommy Bowden, college football coaches
 Necro Butcher, professional wrestler
 Rich Braham, professional football player
 Emily Calandrelli: TV host, actor, and engineer
 Marion Cannon, U.S. Representative from California
 Earl Lemley Core, botanist and local historian
 Lowell Cowell, NASCAR Cup Series driver
 John Douglas, conductor and educator
 William Easterly, economist
 Shelia Eddy, convicted of murdering Skylar Neese
 Jack Fleming, American sports announcer
 Robert C. Frasure, first U.S. Ambassador to Estonia following its independence from Soviet Union
 Robert P. George, founder of American Principles Project
 Linda Goodman, astrologer and poet
 Jedd Gyorko, baseball player
 Edgar F. Heiskell III, West Virginia Secretary of State and lawyer
 Alan Henderson, professional basketball player
 Charlie Hickman, baseball player, made Morgantown his home
 Walter Hough, curator of United States National Museum
 Bob Huggins, West Virginia University head basketball coach
 Dwayne Jones, professional basketball player
 Josh Judy, professional baseball player
 Lawrence Kasdan, screenwriter/director
 Moses Kinkaid, Congressman, sponsor of Kinkaid Land Act
 Hoda Kotb, broadcast journalist
 Don Knotts, actor (City unveiled statue in 2016)
 John Laidley, a founder of Marshall University
 Blanche Lazzell, modern artist, printmaker, and painter
 Frank Lovece, journalist and author
 Paul Mainieri, LSU baseball coach
 William Matheny, singer-songwriter
 Herbert Morrison (journalist), journalist
 Asra Nomani, journalist, political activist
 Francis Harrison Pierpont, 19th century Governor
 Elliott Portnoy, attorney
 Xavier Proctor, football player
 Freddy Quinn, German film star and singer
 David Selby, actor
 Zach Spiker, college basketball coach
 Kimberley Starr, novelist
 Michael Tomasky, journalist and author
 Dorothy Vaughan, mathematician
 Alexander Wade, educational reformer
 Michael Wardian, marathoner and ultra-marathoner
 Kim Weaver, astrophysicist
 Waitman T. Willey, U.S. Senator
 Franklin White, British ballet dancer
 Israel C. White, geologist and professor
 Allison Williams, Miss West Virginia (2003)
 Gene Arden Vance Jr., a Special Operations soldier with the West Virginia National Guard that was killed in action in Afghanistan in 2002.

Sister cities

Morgantown is a sister city of:
  Guanajuato, Mexico
Morgantown established Friendship City relations with Quanshan District, Xuzhou, Jiangsu, China, in 2012.

In popular culture

The cable television network MTV announced in October 2006, that it would tape an eight-episode reality TV series, Show Choir, following Morgantown High School's show choir, which performs songs in four-part harmony, with costumes and choreography, on a competitive circuit. The show was scheduled to premiere Spring 2007, but as of 2018 has yet to air.

The Joni Mitchell song "Morning Morgantown" is popularly believed to be written about Morgantown, West Virginia.

Morgantown is also featured in the game Fallout 76, as the game takes place in West Virginia.

Notes

References

Further reading
 History of the Making of Morgantown, West Virginia, by Callahan, James Morton (Morgantown, W. Virginia, West Virginia University, 1926)
 Morgantown a Bicentennial History, by West Virginia University Public History Option for the Morgantown Bicentennial Commission (Morgantown, W. Virginia, Monongalia Historical Society, 1985)

External links

 City of Morgantown, West Virginia
 Greater Morgantown Convention & Visitors Bureau
 Ancestry.com

 
Cities in West Virginia
County seats in West Virginia
Cities in Monongalia County, West Virginia
West Virginia University
Morgantown metropolitan area
West Virginia populated places on the Monongahela River